Juan José Serrano Macías (born 3 October 1981), commonly known as Juanjo, is a Spanish former footballer who played as a striker.

Club career
Juanjo was born in Calamonte, Province of Badajoz.  After starting his senior career with local Mérida UD's reserve team, he went on to spend one full decade in Segunda División B. He first represented at that level Atlético Madrid B, AD Alcorcón, CD Díter Zafra, Real Jaén, UD Lanzarote, Mazarrón CF, UB Conquense, CF Villanovense and CD Guadalajara.

Juanjo joined La Liga club Granada CF in 2011 but never represented it officially, being loaned to Cádiz CF and UD Logroñés in the same tier. On 20 January 2013 he terminated his contract and returned to Guadalajara, signing a two-and-a-half-year deal.

Aged already 31, Juanjo made his first appearance in Segunda División on 26 January 2013, starting in a 0–2 away loss against Girona FC. His first goal with the professionals came on 30 March as he scored the only at UD Las Palmas, and he netted a second the following weekend, contributing to a 3–1 home victory over Córdoba CF.

On 23 August 2013, Juanjo moved to fellow league side CD Lugo. He totalled only 603 minutes of action in his first and only season, and subsequently joined CD Mirandés also of the second division.

After one season on Lugo, Juanjo played the 2014-15 Segunda División for CD Mirandés, and in the next two seasons for Segunda División B club CF Villanovense.

On 18 July 2017 he joined to CD Santa Amalia on Tercera División. Juanjo retired as a player on August 2019.

References

External links

1981 births
Living people
People from Tierra de Mérida - Vegas Bajas
Sportspeople from the Province of Badajoz
Spanish footballers
Footballers from Extremadura
Association football forwards
Segunda División players
Segunda División B players
Tercera División players
Atlético Madrid B players
AD Alcorcón footballers
Real Jaén footballers
UB Conquense footballers
CD Guadalajara (Spain) footballers
Granada CF footballers
Cádiz CF players
UD Logroñés players
CD Lugo players
CD Mirandés footballers
CF Villanovense players